Crosby was a small hamlet in Lincolnshire which has grown into a suburb in the north of Scunthorpe, North Lincolnshire. Remnants of the old hamlet can be found in Old Crosby.

The Anglican Parish Church is St George's Church, Crosby. Located on the corner of Digby Street and Frodingham Road, it was designed by the architect H.C. Corlette. Construction of the church began in 1924 and the building was consecrated in 1926. Its former clergy includes (John Harvard) Christopher Laurence who was Archdeacon Of Lindsey from 1985 to 1994.

The Crosby Angel War Memorial is located on the corner of Frodingham Road and Sheffield Street West in the grounds of the former Crosby Primary School. It is inscribed with the names of 60 men from the area who died in World War One.

The actress Liz Smith was born in Crosby in 1921.

References 

Scunthorpe